Pablo S. Torre (born September 27, 1985) is a Filipino-American sportswriter and the host of ESPN Daily. Torre hosted (with Bomani Jones) High Noon, a daily show from the new ESPN studios in New York City's South Street Seaport. He is a regular guest on various ESPN shows such as Around the Horn and The Sports Reporters. Torre also frequently serves as an alternate host for Pardon the Interruption, Around the Horn, and Highly Questionable. He has also appeared on Outside the Lines, The Dan Le Batard Show with Stugotz, and TrueHoop. Aside from ESPN-related productions, Torre is also a contributor to National Public Radio.

Education
Torre, whose father Pablo is a urologist and mother a dermatologist, attended Regis High School in New York City. (Torre once humorously referred to his father as "the LeBron James of Filipino urologists.") He graduated from Harvard College magna cum laude with highest honors in sociology in 2007, and was inducted into the Phi Beta Kappa Society. There, he wrote a 114-page thesis entitled Sympathy for the Devil? Child Homicide, Victim Characteristics, and the Sentencing Preferences of the American Conscience, which won the Albert M. Fulton Prize for best thesis in the field of sociology. He contributed to the college newspaper, The Harvard Crimson, and became an executive editor.

Career
Upon graduating from Harvard, Torre joined Sports Illustrated as a staff writer, where his focuses included sports investigations, boxing, and basketball. His 2009 award-winning article, "How (and Why) Athletes Go Broke", along with two follow-up reports, spurred an investigation by the U.S. Securities and Exchange Commission of the investment firm Triton Financial for defrauding investors in a multimillion-dollar scam. A federal jury would later find Triton's CEO Kurt Barton guilty of criminal charges. Broke, an ESPN 30 for 30 documentary, prominently featured Torre, and was based on his research.

On October 10, 2012, Torre joined ESPN as a senior writer for both its website and magazine.

On March 12, 2014, Torre first filled in as host on TV talk show Around the Horn in the absence of Tony Reali. In August of that year, Torre covered for Reali when he took time off for the birth of his daughter. In 2015, Torre was the first person to report that Tony Wroten had begun using the term "Trust the Process" when talking to the Philadelphia 76ers during their rebuilding phase.

In 2016, Torre produced his first 30 for 30 entitled Friedman's Shoes, which was directed by Danny Lee.

In 2018, Torre and Bomani Jones debuted High Noon, a daily show from the new ESPN Studios in New York City's South Street Seaport. The show was cancelled in March 2020.

In 2020, Torre began hosting the ESPN Daily podcast.

Personal life
Torre is of Filipino descent. Torre is married to Elizabeth Doherty since 2016. They have a daughter.

Filmography

References

External links
Official blog

1985 births
Living people
American writers of Filipino descent
The Harvard Crimson people
Sportswriters from New York (state)
Regis High School (New York City) alumni
ESPN people
NPR personalities
Harvard College alumni